Purola Legislative Assembly constituency is one of the 70 assembly constituencies of  Uttarakhand a northern state of India. It is a part of Tehri Garhwal Lok Sabha constituency.

Election results

2022

See also
 Uttarkashi (Uttarakhand Assembly constituency)

References

External link
  
 http://eci.nic.in/eci_main/CurrentElections/CONSOLIDATED_ORDER%20_ECI%20.pdf
 http://ceo.uk.gov.in/files/Election2012/RESULTS_2012_Uttarakhand_State.pdf
 http://www.elections.in/uttarakhand/assembly-constituencies/purola.html

Uttarkashi
Assembly constituencies of Uttarakhand
2002 establishments in Uttarakhand
Constituencies established in 2002